TarraWarra Museum of Art is an art museum in Tarrawarra, Victoria, 45 kilometres northeast of Melbourne. Founded by philanthropists and art collectors Eva and Marc Besen, it is the first museum of art in Australia supported by a significant private endowment.

TarraWarra Museum of Art Limited was registered in 2000. The museum was then formally launched by Prime Minister John Howard on 24 April 2002 in a temporary location in North Melbourne, awaiting completion of a purpose-built museum in the Yarra Valley. The Tarrawarra museum building, designed by Alan Powell from architecture firm Powell & Glenn, was opened in 2003. The museum engages with art, place and ideas.

Collection
Eva and Marc Besen began collecting art in the 1950s. When exhibited in the 1970s, their collection was considered "One of the country's finest collections of Modern Australian art." In addition to the initial gift from the Besen's collection, TarraWarra has continued to acquire works. Artworks from the Museum’s collection are periodically featured in scheduled exhibitions.

The collection includes works by notable Australian artists, such as Arthur Boyd, John Brack, Russell Drysdale, Rosalie Gascoigne, Dale Hickey, Susan Norrie, John Olsen, Patricia Piccinini, Clifton Pugh, Jeffrey Smart, Brett Whiteley and Fred Williams.

TarraWarra Biennial
The TarraWarra Biennial was established in 2006 "to identify new developments in contemporary art practice". Vincent Namatjira's work, Endless circulation, which comprised a series of portraits of the seven Prime Ministers who had been in power in Australia during his lifetime until that point, was exhibited,  along with work by Vernon Ah Kee, Helen Johnson, Wukun Wanambi, Sarah crowEst and Agatha Gothe-Snape.

The third Biennial, in 2012, Sonic Spheres, was curated by the museum's director Victoria Lynn. It brought together 21 pieces using music, sound and voice, and included leading Australian sound artists as well as artists more known for their work in other media. Two examples of the latter were Angela Mesti's Some Dance to Remember, Some Dance to Forget and Christian Thompson’s Dhagunyilangu – Brother, sung in the Bidjara language.

References

External links
 TarraWarra Museum of Art
 Powell & Glenn Architects - TarraWarra Museum of Art

Art museums and galleries in Victoria (Australia)
Art museums established in 2003
2003 establishments in Australia